Francis Fowler may refer to:

Francis George Fowler (1871–1918), English writer
Francis John Fowler (1864–1939), British officer in the Indian Army
Francis Fowler (architect) (1819–1893), English architect

See also
Frances Fowler (1864–1943), American painter
Frank Fowler (disambiguation)